William Lauder may refer to:
William de Lauder (1380–1425), bishop of Glasgow
William Lauder (poet) (1520?–1573), poet
William Lauder (forger) (died 1771), forger
William P. Lauder (born 1960), president and CEO of the Estée Lauder Companies Inc.
William Lauder (priest) (died 1868), Anglican dean
William Preston Lauder (1788–1850), Scottish physician
William Waugh Lauder (1858–1931), Canadian pianist, music critic and lecturer